Giebułtów may refer to the following places in Poland:
Giebułtów, Lower Silesian Voivodeship (south-west Poland)
Giebułtów, Kraków County in Lesser Poland Voivodeship (south Poland)
Giebułtów, Miechów County in Lesser Poland Voivodeship (south Poland)